American post-hardcore band Girls Against Boys has released six full-length studio albums, two studio EPs, and numerous singles.

Girls Against Boys initially released the EP Nineties vs. Eighties in 1990. It was followed up by their first actual full-length album, Tropic of Scorpio, in 1992. After signing to the label Touch and Go Records, they released a trilogy of albums which consisted of 1993's Venus Luxure No. 1 Baby, 1994's Cruise Yourself (which contained their first charting single "(I) Don't Got a Place"), and 1996's House of GVSB. The band then signed to the major label Geffen Records and released the album Freak*on*ica in 1998, which spawned their most successful single "Park Avenue". After departing from the label, they released the 2002 album You Can't Fight What You Can't See, and it was the band's final full-length album since they entered a period of sporadic activity afterwards. Girls Against Boys eventually released the EP entitled The Ghost List in 2013.

In addition to the eight main releases, Girls Against Boys released various other singles and outside contributions. The non-album single "Sexy Sam" in 1994 had contained one song from each of their prior albums up to that point, their Joy Division cover "She's Lost Control" was released as a standalone single in 1995, a promotional compilation by Geffen Records titled Fuse the Power of Now was released in 1998, and Girls Against Boys contributed to the majority of the soundtrack to the film Series 7: The Contenders in 2001.

Albums

Studio albums

Compilation albums

Soundtrack albums

EPs

Singles

Music videos
 "Bulletproof Cupid" (1993)
 "(I) Don't Got a Place" (1994)
 "Kill the Sexplayer" (1995)
 "She's Lost Control" (1995)
 "Super-Fire" (1996)
 "Park Avenue" (1998)
 "Basstation" (2002)

Other appearances
Compilation albums
 Chairman of the Board: Interpretations of Songs Made Famous by Frank Sinatra (Grass Records, 1993)
 Enragez Vous (Black and Noir Records, 1993)
 The Day We Killed Grunge (Caroline Records, 1994)
 Elements of Mammoth (Mammoth Records, 1994)
 Jabberjaw: Good to the Last Drop (Mammoth Records, 1994)
 Guinea Worm (S&M/TJ's Newport, 1994)
 The Day We Exhumed Disco (Caroline Records, 1995)
 Life Is Too Short for Boring Music (EFA, 1995)
 PIAS s'Enrage (Rage/PIAS, 1995)
 A Means to an End: The Music of Joy Division (Virgin Records, 1995)
 Introducing Vol. 4 (Indigo, 1996)
 Kerrang! Welcome to Planet Rock (Roadrunner Records, 1996)
 Studio Brussels '96 (Double T Music, 1996)
 Fuji Rock Festival '97 (TGCS, 1997)
 Everything Is Beautiful (Geffen Records, 1997)
 Vox Spring Collection (Vox, 1998)
 Pinkpop 1998 Sampler (Universal Records, 1998)
 Primal Screen (Upfront, 2001)
 2002 Mordam Sampler (Mordam Records, 2002)
 Touch and Go 25 (Touch and Go, 2006)
 Occupy This Album (Music for Occupy, 2012)
 This Is a Call! (Mojo, 2020)

Soundtracks
 Clerks (Kevin Smith, 1994)
 Mallrats (Kevin Smith, 1995)
 SubUrbia (Richard Linklater, 1996)
 Love God (Frank Grow, 1997)
 Permanent Midnight (David Veloz, 1998)
 Psycho (Gus Van Sant, 1998)
 200 Cigarettes (Risa Bramon Garcia, 1999)
 Blast (Martin Schenk, 2000)
 Terror Firmer (Lloyd Kaufman, 2000)
 Hedwig and the Angry Inch (John Cameron Mitchell, 2001)
 White Oleander (Peter Kosminsky, 2002)
 Rocked with Gina Gershon (Seth Jarrett, 2004)

Video games
 Test Drive Off-Road 3 (PC/PlayStation, 1999)
 Amped 2 (Xbox, 2003)
 Need for Speed: The Run (PC/Xbox 360/PlayStation 3, 2011)

References

Post-hardcore group discographies
Discographies of American artists